, abbreviated as Nismo, is a division of Nissan Motorsports & Customizing focused in motorsport and performance-oriented car models for Nissan. Nismo was initially a company, formed in 1984 as a result of a merger of two motorsport departments, being the in-house tuning, motorsports and performance subsidiary of Nissan. It has competed in JSPC, JTCC, the 24 Hours of Le Mans and the 24 Hours of Daytona. They currently participate in Super GT, GT Racing and Formula E. Nismo ceased to be a company in April 2022 by being merged with sister Autech into a new Nissan subsidiary, Nissan Motorsport & Customizing.

History
The Nismo story began in 1964 when a local company called Prince Motor Company realized that they could boost their sales by going into the competitive motorsport business. Nismo’s first competitive motor sport debut was on 1 May 1964 − in their first race they ended up coming just short however it was bitter sweet as the Skyline took all positions from 2nd to 6th.

The company's intention following the merger was to specialize in sportscar racing, but it also provided support for teams competing in the domestic F3 series.

In 1988 the first dedicated race car by Nissan debuted, and saw incredible performance in circuit races. This vehicle was the iconic Nissan Skyline R32, sporting the GT-R badge.

In 1988, Nismo built its first car, the Saurus for motorsport use for its one-make series. The following year they developed the Skyline GT-R for racing as well as building the 500 evolution editions for road use. The R34, the R32’s generational grandchild was the first car to be produced with a V-Spec.

In December 2021, Nissan said it would merge Nismo and sister company Autech (a tuning and conversion operation) into a new company called Nissan Motorsports & Customizing Co., Ltd.. The merge was completed on April 1, 2022.

Products 
Products include the GT-R, 370Z, Sentra, Frontier, and the Juke Nismo. Soon to be added to the range is the hatchback Nissan Pulsar Nismo and the electric Nissan Leaf

Tuning kits 

Nismo designs and manufactures a range of aftermarket performance parts for Nissan cars including aerodynamics parts such as spoilers and diffusers, alloy wheels, engine and suspension parts. The 2017 Infiniti Q60, being much criticized for its mild exhaust sound, about six months after its introduction had a specially tuned Nismo muffler made available through Infiniti dealers as an aftermarket item.

Most Datsun, Nissan, and Infiniti branded cars have performance parts available from Nismo, either in production or as old stock. For example, Nismo sells parts such as unground cam billets, performance cams, pistons, etc. for the KA24E engine, which was used in the Nissan small pickup truck for several years and also used for the 1989 and 1990 model years of 240SX, a popular car among Import scene enthusiasts (especially Drifters) in North America.

In Japan, the V35 Skyline and Z33 Fairlady have both received several levels of Nismo tuning packages (E-Type, S-Tune, R-Tune, and S1 packages), with a full track spec Fairlady Z debuted at the 2005 Nismo Festival of Speed held at (formerly) Fuji International Raceway.

In February 2007, Nismo announced the launch of the Nismo 380RS. The Nismo 380RS is a factory modified version of the Nissan Z33 Fairlady Z tuned by both Nismo and Autech. Two versions were released, the first was a track-only model called the 380RS-C (C for competition), the second is a street model being sold at Nissan dealers. Both versions use a Nissan VQ series V6 engine, bored and stroked to 3.8L. The Nismo 380RS was only sold in Japan.

Production cars 

The first Nismo-branded car was the 1987 Skyline R31 GTS-R Group A evolution special limited to 823 examples. This was followed by the 1990 Skyline GT-R Nismo of which only 560 were produced. Both cars featured weight-saving, aerodynamic, performance and reliability improvements necessary for the rigours of Group A competition.

The next Nismo release was the Skyline GT-R R34 'Z-Tune'. Intended to celebrate the 2005 20th anniversary of Nismo, the 2003 cancellation of R34 production meant that Nismo was only able to create 20 cars, all based on second-hand V.spec units purchased back from customers with less than 30,000 km on the odometer. Due to rarity the GT-R Z-tune can exceed   in the car market. The engine is an RB28DETT Z2 (a normal GT-R engine with a stroked displacement of 2.8 liters & Nismo parts designed specifically for the Z2). The car weighs .

Nismo was also responsible for the R33 Skyline 400R and S14 Silvia 270R models. Both featured comprehensive modifications to the drivetrain, suspension, brakes, chassis, and aero work. Very limited numbers of both models were sold in 1997, and both command high resale prices even today. These models stressed Nismo's link to street car tuning, and were developed (as was the Z-Tune GT-R) at their Chiba City tuning garage. Nismo street tuned vehicles have been sold at Nissan dealerships for years, and come with full warranties.

List of Nismo-branded consumer vehicles

Japanese Grand Prix
In the 1960s, Nissan competed in the Japanese Grand Prix sports car race.

IMSA GT Championship

Nissan joined the IMSA GT Championship in 1979, where it competed in the GT classes with the 240SX, 280ZX and 300ZX. From 1985 to 1993, they entered the main GTP class with the GTP ZX-Turbo and NPT-90. Geoff Brabham won four GTP drivers championships with Nissan from 1988 to 1991, and the manufacturer won the 1992 24 Hours of Daytona and the 1989, 1990 and 1991 12 Hours of Sebring.

World Sports Prototype Championship

In the 1980s and 1990s, Nissan raced at the All Japan Sports Prototype Championship and 24 Hours of Le Mans with sports prototypes such as the R88C, R89C, R90C and R391. They claimed the 1990, 1991 and 1992 JSPC titles, but they never won at Le Mans. Notable Nissan drivers in this era include Masahiro Hasemi, Kazuyoshi Hoshino, Masahiko Kageyama and Toshio Suzuki.

Touring Car Racing 

In the 1980s, the manufacturer entered the Fuji Grand Champion Series with Group 5 Bluebird, Skyline and Silvia silhouettes and the Japanese Touring Car Championship with production Skyline models. In the 1990s, Nissan competed in Supertouring championships around the world with the Nissan Primera, winning the 1999 British Touring Car Championship with Laurent Aïello.

Supercars Championship 
From 2013 onwards Nissan competed in the Supercars Championship with Kelly Racing fielding four Nissan Altimas. The factory backing concluded at the end of 2018, although the Altimas continued to be privately entered in 2019.

International GT Racing

In 2009, Nissan entered the FIA GT1 World Championship with a Nismo-developed Nissan GT-R. Krumm and Lucas Luhr were 2011 drivers champions. Since 2011, Nismo has produced the GT-R GT3, which has competed in the Blancpain Endurance Series. Nismo has also developed production class Nissan GT-R cars for the 24 Hours of Nürburgring.

They also have a pool of drivers, known as the Nismo Global Driver Exchange. This allows factory drivers the chance to race in big events such as the Le Mans 24 Hours, the 24 Hours of Dubai and the Bathurst 12 Hour.

Prototype racing 

Nissan's first LMP1 Hybrid which was unsuccessful and caused Nissan and Nismo to withdraw Le Mans entirely.

From 2011 to 2016, Nissan is involved in the FIA World Endurance Championship and European Le Mans Series as a LMP2 engine supplier. They have had success with Greaves Motorsport, Signature Team, OAK Racing, TDS Racing, G-Drive Racing and SMP Racing. In 2017, Nissan entered the DPi class of the WeatherTech SportsCar Championship with Extreme Speed Motorsports.

Nissan announced in June 2014, that Nismo will enter the LMP1 category to fight for the FIA World Endurance Championship against Audi, Toyota and Porsche. Following a disappointing performance in the 2015 24 Hours of Le Mans, the program's remaining schedule in 2015 was pushed back, with the team intending a regular rebut in the 2016 season; however on 22 December 2015, Nissan announced that it was shuttering the program altogether.

Formula E 
In the inaugural season of Formula E, DAMS (as e.dams) partnered with sister company Renault to form Team e.dams Renault, where they became the first Formula E Team's Champion. At the end of the 2017-18 season, Renault decided to focus on Formula One with Nissan taking over Renault's place in the partnership with e.dams to form Nissan e.dams for the 2018-19 season. In April 2022, Nissan announced the acquisition of the e.dams race team and entered the 2022-23 season as Nissan Formula E Team.

Current teams

Super GT
GT500
  NISMO
  NDDP Racing with B-Max Engineering
  Team Impul
  Kondo Racing

GT300
  GAINER
  Bosou Drago Corse
  NLIZZ Racing
  Kondo Racing

Super Taikyu
ST-X (GT3)
  MP Racing 
  HELM Motor Sports
  GTNET Motor Sports

ST-3 (GT4)
  Okabe Jidosha Motorsport 
  FKS Team Fukushima
  MAX Racing

FIA Formula E
  Nissan Formula E Team

Current factory drivers

Racing results

Formula E
(key) (results in bold indicate pole position; results in italics indicate fastest lap)

Notes
  – Driver was fastest in group qualifying stage and was given one championship point.
 † – Driver did not finish the race, but was classified as he completed over 90% of the race distance.

See also
 Infiniti Performance Line

References

External links

  Middlehurst Motorsport & Nismo Official Press Release
 Nismo official web site , Japanese official web site for Nismo products.
 Nissan Motorsports, coverage and information on Nissan motorsports events. 
 Nismo USA official website
 Nismo official website

Nissan in motorsport
Official motorsports and performance division of automakers
Automotive companies established in 1984
Japanese auto racing teams
World Rally Championship teams
24 Hours of Le Mans teams
World Sportscar Championship teams
Super GT teams
FIA World Endurance Championship teams
Formula E teams
European Rally Championship teams
Deutsche Tourenwagen Masters teams
FIA GT Championship teams
Japanese racecar constructors